Sören Dreßler (born 26 December 1975) is a German former footballer.

Coaching career
In 2011 he took over the coaching position at SSV Anhausen in the Kreisliga Schwaben-Augsburg. In the summer 2013 he became the new head coach of Kissinger SC in Augsburg.

Ahead of the 2015/16 season, Dreßler was appointed head coach of TSV Schwaben Augsburg. He left the position in the summer 2019.

In March 2020, 44-year old Dreßler played one game for the third team of his former club, SSV Anhausen.

References

External links
 

1975 births
Living people
People from Schleiz
People from Bezirk Gera
German footballers
Footballers from Thuringia
SSV Reutlingen 05 players
FC Augsburg players
FC Ingolstadt 04 players
2. Bundesliga players
Association football defenders
FC Ingolstadt 04 II players
German football managers
TSV Schwaben Augsburg managers